Bai ye (English: tofu skin, Chinese: 百叶, pinyin: bái yè) is a main ingredient of some traditional Chinese dishes, such as bean curd skin roll (Chinese:百叶包, pinyin: bái yè bāo; literally "Hundred Pages Bun") that is widely known in southern regions of China and some of north regions of China and bean curd knot (Chinese:百叶结).  Tofu skin is a kind of pressed tofu. In China, pressed tofu comes in myriad shapes, sizes, and texture. Producers make tofu skin by pressing bean curds under much pressure.

Varieties
There are various cooking styles for bean curd skin. The two most common styles are tofu skin roll and tofu knot.

Tofu skin roll (Chinese: 百叶包)
Tofu skin roll is a common way of cooking bean curd skin. When served, it is made of a cylindrical tofu skin roll on the outside and vegetables and meat on the inside. The fillings range from vegetable to pork or beef.  Additional ingredients such as salt, sugar, and vegetable oil may be added. Generally, this dish is served with wheat gluten in a soup setting.

Tofu skin knot (Chinese: 百叶结)

Tofu skin knot is a knotted strip of tofu skin. It is also the main ingredient of Shanghai-style red-braised pork belly. Shanghai-style red-braised pork is a slow stew of pork belly with tofu skin knots that are seasoned with sugar, soy sauce, Chinese wine, and spices. The tofu skin knots in this dish soak up the sauce and become delicious.

See also

 Tofu skin
 Abura-age
 List of tofu dishes

References 

"Asian Tofu: Discover the Best, Make Your Own, and Cook It at Home", Andrea Nguyen, 2012, Ten Speed Press, 

Jiangsu cuisine
Tofu dishes
Soy-based foods